The Timber Trail, originally known as the Central North Island Rail Trail or Pureora Timber Trail, in the North Island of New Zealand is an  cycleway (also used by walkers and hunters) in Pureora Forest Park, fully opened in 2013, with 35 bridges (built by DoC staff, community max workers, or contractors), including eight large suspension bridges (one of the longest on a New Zealand cycleway, much more stable than the swing bridges used on older tracks). It is one of several cycleways developed as part of the New Zealand Cycle Trail and passes through some of the last remaining podocarp forests of rimu, tōtara, miro, mataī and kahikatea, as well as some exotic forestry and regenerating bush. About half the trail is on the track-bed of the old Ellis and Burnand Tramway, including a spiral and tunnel.

It is easier to start the Timber Trail from Pureora (Northern end of the Timber Trail) to Ongarue. Although there is a hill climb up to Mt Pureora in this direction. Fit riders can cover the trail in a day.

There are three main access points to the Timber Trail:

North – Pureora Village, signposted from SH30 between Te Kuiti and Mangakino. 
Centre – from Piropiro campsite at the end of Kokomiko Rd, Waimiha.
South – Ongarue, signposted from SH4.

Northern section 

Pureora to Piropiro (39.5 km) Track category: Intermediate/Grade 3

0–8 km Easy/Grade 2 Pureroa DoC Centre to the first shelter.

It crosses Tui Rd, to the shelter below Mt Pureora.

8–23 km — Mt Pureora to Angel's Rest grade 3 (intermediate)

Two large suspension bridges cross tributaries of the river at Bog Inn Creek and the similar sized Orauhora crossing.

23–40 km — Angel’s Rest – Okauaka Ford – Maramataha River

After the campground, the track rejoins the tramway to Maramataha Rodd, then follows Piropiro Stream on a new track to the Maramataha Bridge.

Southern section 

(Easy/Grade 2) 43 km Piropiro to Ongarue

40–52 km – Piropiro to Angels Rest Intermediate/Grade 3

Construction required much rock drilling and anchor work.

52–64 km — Maramataha River – Deer Park junction – Waione Stream

South of the bridge the steepest climb on the trail zigzags to a plateau on a new track. From the plateau quad tracks lead to the north end of the Ellis and Burnand Tramway, Ongarue tramway, which the trail then mostly follows on easier gradients to Ongarue. These tramways were cleared in 2011.

64–74 km — Waione Stream – Waikoura Stream – Goat Creek

A  suspension bridge crosses Waione Stream, then the tramway runs to Waikoura Stream, passing No. 11 and No. 10 camps, and the No. 9 tramway junction. The information board says Waikoura Camp at No. 9 was the largest and last camp on this tramway, built in 1950 and closed in 1963, with 6 houses and 9 single men's huts. A  suspension bridge crosses Waikoura Stream and a tramway links to the  Mangatukutuku suspension bridge, then No. 7 tramway runs to Goat Creek.

74–83 km — Goat Creek – Ongarue Spiral – Mangakahu Rd

A three span, curved, timber trestle bridge crosses Goat Creek, resembling many of the tramway bridges, then  of tramway cleared in 2011 leads to the spiral.

The Ongarue Spiral took the tramway up  on a grade the bush lokeys could cope with (for  the gradient averaged 1 in 30). Below the spiral the tramway was built by cutting a ledge in the ignimbrite cliffs. It continues to drop until reaching the bank of the Mangakahu Stream. The final  are undulating to the end of the trail in a car park beside Mangakahu Road,  from Ongarue.

History 
The Timber Trail, originally known as the Central North Island Rail Trail, cost about $5.5m to build. It was one of the seven 'Quick Start' Projects announced in 2009, which were publicised as promoting economic growth The Timber Trail took longer to complete than some later projects, so it was the tenth New Zealand Cycle Trail to be completed since Prime Minister John Key had launched the cycleways with the Green Party.

By mid-2011 only  was open, with tenders still not let for interpretation panels and five bridges. It was then that the contract with the Ministry of Economic Development for community max and taskforce green workers ended. 12 staff had been trained in 12 months in basic woodwork, track construction, quad bike and 4WD driving and health and safety. DoC employed five from the MED scheme for six months to build  bridges, shelters, other structures, and some track construction. Another went on 'community max' with the recreation team.

Ongarue Spiral restoration work began in July 2011. The tunnel was strengthened and the stream re-diverted out of it (it had been diverted in when the tramway was replaced by logging trucks). The tunnel ceiling was reinforced with mesh, a lower bridge built to the right of the original bridge to preserve bits of the original and remnants of the upper bridge preserved in the new trail bridge.

Negotiations were held to build a  suspension bridge over Mangakahu Stream to end the trail further east on Mangakahu Rd, but the trail as built has another  of undulating ride keeping north of the stream, roughly following the tramway (see map below) to within  of Ongarue.

Maramataha Bridge was finished in early October 2012 and opened on 1 November 2012. The northern end Bog Creek and Orauhora suspension bridges were ready by December 2012.

On 1 December 2012 southern section opening day 150 cyclists rode its four suspension bridges, the tramline, and Ongarue Spiral.

The Timber Trail was declared fully open when the Minister of Conservation cut the ribbon on Saturday, 30 March 2013.

After the opening improvements and maintenance continued; in winter 2013 additional pumice was helicoptered to boggy patches on the Mt Pureora section. Other changes are likely. For example, there were concession negotiations about lodgings at Piropiro Flats to supplement the existing campground, where stumps had been cleared.

Most of the Timber Trail's southern section follows the tramway built by J. W. Ellis and Harry Burnand. Their timber sawmill at Ongarue was fed with logs (especially rimu) by a gradually growing network of tramways from 1903 until floods damaged the lines in 1958. From then until closure in 1966 the tramway was converted for use by logging trucks. However, as one of the best preserved bush tramways, it is considered a nationally significant site.

Economic development 
One of the purposes of the cycle trails was to encourage economic development in remote rural areas.

See also 
Bush Tramway Club
Ellis and Burnand
 New Zealand Cycle Trail
 Rail trail

Further reading 
A national history overview on bush tramways: Mahoney, P, 1998, The Era of the Bush Tramway in New Zealand, IPL, Wellington.
Sparse Timber Sawmillers: Ken Anderson, 2007  – a history of the logging, tramline and mill from 1903 until the mill closed in 1966.

References

External links 

Timber Trail New Zealand
1:50,000 map of Timber Trail (35MB).
Climax lokey on Mangatukutuku viaduct with a train of logs.
History and photos of Climax lokey 1650.
Recent photos of former tramway on Flickr
Bush trams – Te Ara Encyclopedia of NZ
Biographies of Ellis & Burnand directors –
Henry Valder – Te Ara Encyclopedia of NZ
J W Ellis obituary – 1918 Auckland Star
Ellis & Burnand was bought by Fletcher, now trading as PlaceMakers
 Camp Epic

Hiking and tramping tracks in New Zealand
New Zealand Cycle Trail
Hiking and tramping tracks in Waikato
Transport in Manawatū-Whanganui